Pustin Duz may refer to:
 Pustin Duz, North Khorasan
 Pustin Duz, Razavi Khorasan